Holy Sick is the debut EP by Australian rock band Waax, released independently on 29 September 2015 through SoundCloud, and commercially on 14 December. It was produced by Konstantin Kersting and recorded at Airlock Studios in Brisbane. It was the last recording to feature bassist and guitarist Ariana Pelser and Elijah Gall respectively, only appearing on the track "Wisdom Teeth".

Background and promotion
Waax's debut single "Wisdom Teeth" was released on 23 May 2014. "Wisdom Teeth" was submitted to Triple J Unearthed and won on 28 July, earning the band a spot on the Triple J Unearthed BIGSOUND showcase lineup. A music video for "Wisdom Teeth" was released on 8 December.

Their second single, "I for an Eye" was released on 3 June 2015. The music video followed on 16 July.

Without any prior announcements, the EP Holy Sick was released on 29 September.

The third single, "Holy Sick" was released on 4 October. On 16 December a music video for "Holy Sick" was released, two days after the EP's commercial release.

Waax later performed a five-date Holy Sick EP Tour in December.

Writing and composition
The single "I for an Eye" has frontwoman Maz DeVita "questioning herself and her place, particularly as a female, in the music industry, followed by the anger at herself for feeling insignificant." The title-track "Holy Sick" has been described as dissing then-Prime Minister Tony Abbott and his views on immigration.

Critical reception

The EP received positive reviews. Jack Doonar from AAA Backstage, praising the grungy hard rock sound, said: ""Holy Sick" is 11 minutes and 14 seconds of pure WAAX. Frontwoman Marie DeVita leads a young band that’s smart enough to known there’s more to rock than just turning it up to eleven." The AU Review rated it 8.7/10 and praised DeVita's vocal range saying: "[DeVita] has an incredibly wide range, going from angry howling to soulful and evocative crooning, sometimes within the same line."

Carmel Lewis from Blank Gold Coast gave it a positive review, saying: "Waax and Holy Sick are an absolute pleasure, in a warped way, to see, hear, dance, laugh, cry and tear your teeth out to."

Track listing

Personnel
Adapted from SoundCloud.

Waax
 Marie DeVita – vocals, album artwork
 Elijah Gall – lead guitar (only on track 4)
 Chris Antolak – lead guitar
 Ewan Birtwell – rhythm guitar
 Ariana Pelser – bass (only on track 4)
 Tom Griffin – bass
 Tom Bloomfield – drums

Production
 Konstantin Kersting – producer, mixing, recording
 Scott Horscroft – mixing, mastering
 Dave Neil – mixing, mastering
 Steve Smart – mastering

References

2015 debut EPs
Waax (band) EPs
Song recordings produced by Konstantin Kersting